The Lone Star Brahmas are a Tier II junior ice hockey team in the North American Hockey League (NAHL) based in North Richland Hills, Texas (a suburb of Fort Worth). The Brahmas play their home games at the NYTEX Sports Centre.

The Brahmas nickname is a tribute to the Fort Worth Brahmas of the Central Hockey League, which played their final six seasons (most notably winning the 2009 Ray Miron President's Cup championship) at the NYTEX Sports Centre.

The Brahmas most recently won the 2017 Robertson Cup.

History
The franchise was previously known as the Texas Tornado when they started playing in the North American Hockey League (NAHL) for the 1999–2000 season. They originally played at the NYTEX Sports Centre (then called the Blue Line Ice Complex) until 2003 when the Tornado moved to Frisco, Texas, and the Dr Pepper Arena in 2003 (after which the Lone Star Cavalry took their place, playing in the NAHL for one season). The Tornado won five Robertson Cups; in 2001, 2004, 2005, 2006, and 2012. The Tornado won the 2012 Robertson Cup after losing in the Division Semifinals to the Topeka RoadRunners but advanced to the round-robin stage as the host of the 2012 tournament.

However, the on-ice success could not cure the Tornado's off-ice financial woes nor the money they lost the last three years. After seeking out all options to remain in the Dallas-Fort Worth Metroplex, the Tornado sold the team to Texas Hockey Partners, who moved the team back to the NYTEX Sports Centre and gave them their current Brahmas name.

Season-by-season records

References

External links 
Official site
Ticket information
Official League site

North American Hockey League teams
Ice hockey teams in Texas
Ice hockey teams in the Dallas–Fort Worth metroplex
Ice hockey clubs established in 2013
2013 establishments in Texas